Eliécer Pérez (born October 14, 1972) is a Cuban sport shooter. He won a silver medal for the rifle three positions at the 2007 Pan American Games in Rio de Janeiro, Brazil. At age thirty-four, Perez made his official debut for the 2008 Summer Olympics in Beijing, where he competed for all three rifle shooting events.

In his first event, 10 m air rifle, Perez was able to hit a total of 585 points within six attempts, finishing forty-fourth in the qualifying rounds. Few days later, he placed fifty-second in the 50 m rifle prone, by one target behind Oman's Dadallah Al-Bulushi from the final attempt, with a total score of 582 points. In his third and last event, 50 m rifle 3 positions, Perez was able to shoot 394 targets in a prone position, 373 in standing, and 367 in kneeling, for a total score of 1,134 points, finishing only in forty-seventh place.

References

External links
NBC Olympics Profile

1972 births
Living people
Cuban male sport shooters
Olympic shooters of Cuba
Shooters at the 2008 Summer Olympics
Pan American Games silver medalists for Cuba
Pan American Games medalists in shooting
Shooters at the 2007 Pan American Games
Medalists at the 2007 Pan American Games
21st-century Cuban people